Tice is an unincorporated community and census-designated place (CDP) in Lee County, Florida, United States. As of the 2020 census, the CDP population was 4,853. It is part of the Cape Coral-Fort Myers, Florida Metropolitan Statistical Area.

Geography
Tice is in north-central Lee County at  (26.674815, -81.817565). It is bordered to the south and west by the city of Fort Myers, the county seat. Its northern edge is the Caloosahatchee River.

Florida State Road 80 (Palm Beach Boulevard) is the main road through the community, leading northeast  to Interstate 75 and southwest  to the center of Fort Myers.

Demographics

As of the census of 2000, there were 4,538 people, 1,556 households, and 1,026 families residing in the CDP. The racial makeup of the CDP was 49.83% Hispanic,  37.07% African American, 11.25% Non-Hispanic White, 0.66% Native American, 1.06% Asian, 0.13% Pacific Islander, 2.08% from other races, and 4.36% from two or more races.

There were 1,556 households, out of which 33.4% had children under the age of 18 living with them, 41.0% were married couples living together, 16.6% had a female householder with no husband present, and 34.0% were non-families. 24.4% of all households were made up of individuals, and 9.1% had someone living alone who was 65 years of age or older.  The average household size was 2.92 and the average family size was 3.40.

In the CDP, the population was spread out, with 29.5% under the age of 18, 10.8% from 18 to 24, 29.9% from 25 to 44, 18.7% from 45 to 64, and 11.1% who were 65 years of age or older.  The median age was 31 years. For every 100 females, there were 111.4 males.  For every 100 females age 18 and over, there were 114.7 males.

The median income for a household in the CDP was $25,453, and the median income for a family was $26,885. Males had a median income of $21,900 versus $18,214 for females. The per capita income for the CDP was $12,206.  About 28.2% of families and 33.1% of the population were below the poverty line, including 44.5% of those under age 18 and 26.9% of those age 65 or over.

References

Census-designated places in Lee County, Florida
Census-designated places in Florida